is a railway station in Meguro, Tokyo, Japan, operated by the private railway operator Tokyu Corporation.

Lines
This station is served by the following lines:

Station layout

Ground-level platforms

The Tokyu Oimachi Line platforms are scheduled to be lengthened to handle seven-car trains on express services during fiscal 2017.

Elevated platforms
The station has two elevated island platforms for the Tokyu Toyoko Line, serving four tracks.

Notes

History
This was renamed  (using different characters from present) on 22 October 1929. The characters using in the Japanese station name were changed to the present style on 20 January 1966.

Surrounding area

The surrounding area encompasses the  area of Meguro and  area of Setagaya.

Bus services
Bus services operated by Tokyu Bus are provided from the Jiyūgaoka bus stop and Jiyugaoka Station Entrance bus stop.

See also
 List of railway stations in Japan

References

External links

  

Railway stations in Japan opened in 1927
Tokyu Toyoko Line
Tokyu Oimachi Line
Stations of Tokyu Corporation
Railway stations in Tokyo